Tambellini is a surname. Notable people with the surname include:

Adam Tambellini (born 1994), Canadian ice hockey player
Addie Tambellini (1936–2004), Canadian ice hockey player
Aldo Tambellini (1930–2020), American artist
Jeff Tambellini (born 1984), Canadian ice hockey player
Roger Tambellini (born 1975), American golfer
Steve Tambellini (born 1958), Canadian ice hockey player and executive